James Clifford Timlin (born August 5, 1927) is an American prelate of the Roman Catholic Church. He served as bishop of the Diocese of Scranton in Pennsylvania from 1984 to 2003.  Timlin was accused in a 2018 Pennsylvania grand jury report of covering up sexual abuse crimes by priests in his diocese while bishop.

Biography

Early years 
Timlin was born on August 5, 1927, in Scranton, Pennsylvania, to James and Helen (née Norton) Timlin. He received his elementary education at St. John the Evangelist Grade School in Wilkes-Barre, Pennsylvania, and Holy Rosary Grade School in Scranton.  He then attended Holy Rosary High School. After high school, Timlin attended St. Charles College in Catonsville, Maryland and St. Mary's Seminary in Baltimore  He then studied at the Pontifical North American College and Pontifical Gregorian University in Rome.

Priesthood 
On July 16, 1951, Timlin was ordained to the priesthood for the Diocese of Scranton by Archbishop Martin J. O'Connor. After earning his Bachelor of Sacred Theology degree from the Gregorian University, Timlin was appointed as assistant pastor of St. John the Evangelist Parish in Pittston, Pennsylvania, in 1952.

Timlin then served as assistant pastor of St. Peter's Cathedral in Scranton from 1953 to 1966, when he was named assistant chancellor of the diocese and private secretary to Bishop J. Carroll McCormick. Timlin was raised by the Vatican to the rank of chaplain to his holiness on August 3, 1967, and became chancellor of the diocese on December 15, 1971.  Timlin was honored by the Vatican as a prelate of honor on April 23, 1972. He also served as chairman of the diocesan Liturgical Commission and the Priests' Education Committee, as well as librarian and secretary of St. Pius X Seminary in Dalton, Pennsylvania. Timlin became a member of the diocesan Board of Consultors in 1972, and president of the board of directors of The Catholic Light in 1975.

Auxiliary Bishop and Bishop of Scranton 
On July 26, 1976, Pope Paul VI appointed Timlin as an auxiliary bishop of the Diocese of Scranton and titular bishop of Gunugus. He received his episcopal consecration on September 21, 1976, from Bishop McCormick, with Archbishop John R. Quinn and Bishop Stanley J. Ott serving as co-consecrators, at St. Peter's Basilica in Vatican City. Serving a five-year term as episcopal moderator of the National Association of Holy Name Societies, Timlin became vicar general of the diocese in 1976 and pastor of the Nativity of Our Lord Parish in Scranton in 1979. In 1983, Timlin was named chairman of the board of advisors of St. Pius X Seminary and of the Preparatory Commission for the Diocesan Synod.

On April 24, 1984, Pope John Paul II appointed Timlin as the eighth bishop of the Diocese of Scranton. Installed on June 7, 1984, he was the first native of Scranton to become its diocesan bishop. During his tenure, Timlin held the Second Diocesan Synod, established the "Bishop's Annual Appeal", presided over a major restructuring of parishes due to the priest shortage, and introduced a new policy for Catholic schools consisting of regional mergers, construction of modern facilities, new fund-raising efforts, and a more equitable sharing of operational costs between parents, pastors, and the diocese.

On March 14, 1985, Timlin announced that he would not attend two events honoring Catholic congressmen because he did not agree with their stands on abortion rights for women.  The first event was honoring Democratic House Representative Peter W. Rodino Jr. at a St. Patrick's Day dinner in Lackawanna County, Pennsylvania.  The second event was the awarding of an honorary degree to Democratic House Speaker Tip O'Neill Jr. at a commencement ceremony at the University of Scranton. In 2003, Timlin refused to attend the commencement ceremonies for the University of Scranton, because of what he viewed as the pro-choice stands of honorary degree-recipient Chris Matthews.

Retirement and legacy 
After reaching the mandatory retirement age of 75 in 2002, Timlin sent his letter of resignation as bishop of Scranton to Pope John Paul II; the pope accepted it on July 25, 2003. Timlin then served as administrator of St. Joseph's Parish in Wilkes-Barre from February to July 2004, when he became rector of Villa St. Joseph in Dunmore, Pennsylvania, the diocesan residence for retired priests.

On August 14, 2018, a Pennsylvania grand Jury investigation criticized Timlin's handling of sexual abuse allegations against Thomas Skotek, a priest at St Casimir Parish in Freeland, Pennsylvania.  Between 1980 and 1985, Skotek had raped and eventually impregnated a teenage girl in the parish. In October 1986, after Timlin learned about the crime, he sent Skotek to Saint Luke Institute in Silver Spring, Maryland, for psychological evaluation.  Timlin wrote to Skotek at Saint Luke on October 9, 1986: "This is a very difficult time in your life, and I realize how upset you are. I share your grief. (...) With the help of God, who never abandons us and who is always near, when we need him, this too will pass away, and all will be able to pick up and go on living. Please be assured that I am most willing to do whatever I can do to help." In 1987, after Skotek returned to the diocese, Timlin reassigned him to St. Aloysius Parish in Wilkes-Barre.  Timlin never notified parishioners in St. Aloysius or civil authorities about Skotek's rape of the girl. On December 13, 1989, the diocese sent a payment of $75,000 to the family of the rape victim. As part of the settlement, the family had to sign a non-disclosure agreement and liability waiver for both the diocese and Skotek. The 2018 grand jury investigation also indicated that Timlin sent a request to the judge sentencing Robert Caparelli, another priest convicted of sexual abuse, asking that he be sent to a church treatment center instead of prison. On June 11, 2020, the University of Scranton removed Timlin's name from all of its facilities, renaming its plaza Romero Plaza, after Salvadoran Archbishop Óscar Romero.

On August 31, 2018, Scranton Bishop Joseph Bambera forbade Timlin from representing the diocese at any public events, liturgical or otherwise. This was the strongest action that Bambera could take against Timlin.  Bambera also referred the Timlin case to the Vatican Congregation for Bishops. Bambera had served as the vicar for priests for the diocese from 1995 to 1998, and he later admitted helping Timlin reassign a priest who had abused a minor, although Timlin made the decision.

On November 12, 2018, Timlin defied Bambera's order by attending the US Conference of Catholic Bishops (USCCB) general assembly in Baltimore.  On February 25, 2020, Timlin again defied Bambera by attending the installation mass of Archbishop Nelson J. Pérez, dressed in bishop's regalia.  A spokesperson for the Archdiocese of Philadelphia confirmed that they had invited Timlin to the mass.

Timlin, Bambera and the Diocese of Scranton were sued in July 2020 by three men claiming sexual abuse when they were minors by diocese priests.  Two plaintiffs alleged abuse by Michael J. Pulicare, a priest in Lackawanna County, Pennsylvania, in the 1970's.  The third plaintiff said he was abused by Ralph N. Ferraldo, an assistant pastor at Our Lady of Grace Parish in Hazleton, Pennsylvania, from 1982 to 1983.

See also
 

 Catholic Church hierarchy
 Catholic Church in the United States
 Historical list of the Catholic bishops of the United States
 List of Catholic bishops of the United States
 Lists of patriarchs, archbishops, and bishops

References

External links
 Roman Catholic Diocese of Scranton Official Site

Episcopal succession

1927 births
Living people
People from Scranton, Pennsylvania
20th-century Roman Catholic bishops in the United States
21st-century Roman Catholic bishops in the United States
St. Charles College alumni
Pontifical Gregorian University alumni
Catholics from Pennsylvania
Ecclesiastical passivity to Catholic sexual abuse cases